Peak Crossing is a rural locality split between the City of Ipswich and the Scenic Rim Region of Queensland, Australia.

Geography

The town is surrounded by farming land, mostly small cropping. The western boundary is marked by the east branch of Warrill Creek, a tributary of the Bremer River. Just upstream from where the road joining Peak Crossing with Mutdapilly crosses Warrill Creek is the Churchbank Weir.

The eastern parts of Peak Crossing are dominated by the naturally vegetated central peaks of the Flinders Peak Group.  These include Mount Goolman, Ivorys Rock (Muntambin), Mount Blaine and Flinders Peak.  Also located here is the Flinders Peak Conservation Park and sections of the Flinders-Goolman Conservation Estate.  These parks are used for bushwalking, horse riding, mountain bike riding and camping.

Ipswich – Boonah Road (State Route 93) runs through from north to south.

History
The name Peak Crossing  refers to a mountain and a once important road crossing of Purga Creek.

The mountain Flinders Peak is to the east of the township, named in honour of the explorer Matthew Flinders.

The road crossing is the intersection of the Ipswich-Boonah Road and the Old Warwick Road (which connected Ipswich to the local towns Boonah and Warwick respectively), which is adjacent to Purga Creek.

Purga Creek No 2 School opened on 4 September 1871. It was renamed Peak Mountain State School before 1875. In the late 1920s it was renamed Peak Crossing State School.

The Fassifern railway line (Queensland's first branch railway line) opened from Ipswich to Harrisville on 10 July 1882.  Hillside railway station,  Rocktown railway station and  Peak Crossing railway station, all on the Ipswich Boonah Road, serve the areas north of Purga Creek. Flinders railway station on Flinders Road serves the area south of Purga Creek. On 12 September 1887, the line was extended from Harrisville to Dugundan. The line closed in June 1964.

Peak Crossing Post Office opened on 2 January 1886 (a receiving office had been open from 1885.

In October 1872, tenders were called to construct a Congregational Church near Peak Mountain. In 1929, a new church was built by local builders Walter Florence and Charlie Meier. The former church building was sold and relocated to Rosevale to replace the Lutheran church which was burned down there  in 1928. In 1977, the Congregational Church amalgamated into the Uniting Church in Australia. As at 2020, it is known as Flinders Uniting Church.

In 1882, the first Catholic church in the Boonah Parish was erected at Peak Crossing and dedicated to St Patrick. George McDonald donated  of land and the church was built by James Madden of Ipswich. It had a Gothic door at the front and each of the two sides of the building had 4 Gothic windows. It was officially opened and blessed on Sunday 10 December 1882 by parish priest of Ipswich, Father Andrew Horan. It had been arranged that Bishop Robert Dunne would officiate but he did not attend on the day. The ceremony attracted a large attendance from local people as well as approximately 400 people who came from Ipswich on a train specially organised for the event. It was not possible to accommodate everyone within the church for the ceremony.

In November 1911, St Patrick's Catholic Church was struck by a cyclone and badly damaged. While temporary repairs were carried it, it was discovered that the timber of church had been damaged by white ants. A decision was made to build a new church and St James's Catholic Church was officially opened on 6 September 1914 by Archbishop James Duhig. As at 2020, the church is now known as St John's Catholic Church at 30 Fassifern Street.

On 3 November 1924, a meeting of residents was held at the school to propose the erection of a public hall. In 1925 a piece of land approx  was purchased from Wilhelm Althaus for £20. Mr Wyman was the architect for a fee of £6/2/9 and the builder was A. F. Schelbach for £525/5/9. The hall was officially opened on Friday 20 August 1926 by Ernest Bell, the local Member of the Queensland Legislative Assembly for Fassifern.

On Remembrance Day, 11 November, 2018, the new Peak Crossing ANZAC Memorial was officially dedicated.

Heritage listings
Peak Crossing has the following heritage-listed sites:
 33-35 Fassifern Street: Peak Crossing Public Hall 
93 Flinders Street: Flinders Uniting Church

Education 

Peak Crossing State School is a government primary (Prep-6) school for boys and girls at Ipswich-Boonah Road. In 2018, the school had an enrolment of 215 students with 22 teachers (16 full-time equivalent) and 14 non-teaching staff (8 full-time equivalent).

Amenities 
The Peak Mountain View Park on Ipswich Boonah Road  is provided by the Scenic Rim Regional Council. It features open space with play equipment, electric BBQs, picnic shelters as well as public toilets and off-street car parking. The Peak Crossing ANZAC memorial is within the park. 

The Scenic Rim Regional Council operates a mobile library service which visits the Peak Mountain View Park.

The Peak Crossing branch of the Queensland Country Women's Association meets in the Peak Crossing Public Hall.

References

Further reading

External links

 

Towns in Queensland
Scenic Rim Region
Localities in Queensland
City of Ipswich